Homoeosoma parvalbum is a species of snout moth in the genus Homoeosoma. It was described by André Blanchard and Ed Knudson in 1985. It is found in Texas, United States.

References

Moths described in 1985
Phycitini